Forsyth High School may refer to one of several high schools in the United States:

Forsyth High School (Missouri) — Forsyth, Missouri
Forsyth High School (Montana) — Forsyth, Montana
East Forsyth High School — Kernersville, North Carolina
West Forsyth High School (disambiguation), various
East Forsyth High School (Georgia)
Forsyth Central High School — Cumming, Georgia
South Forsyth High School — Cumming, Georgia
North Forsyth High School (Georgia) — Cumming, Georgia
North Forsyth High School (North Carolina) — Winston-Salem, North Carolina
Maroa-Forsyth Senior High School — Maroa, Illinois